Wolfhound is a 1992 Soviet action film by Mikhail Tumanishvili.

Cast 
 Inara Slucka
 Aleksei Guskov
 Anatoli Romashin
 Valeri Barinov
 Aleksandr Fatyushin
 Aleksandr Ilyin
 Vladimir Ilyin
 Vladimir Serdyukov
 Vladimir Troshin
 Vladimir Basov, Jr.
 Maria Vinogradova
 Oksana Arbuzova
 Vitali Moskalenko
 Yuri Shumilo

External links

1991 films
Mosfilm films
1990s crime action films
Soviet crime action films
Russian crime action films
Films directed by Mikhail Tumanishvili
1990s Russian-language films